Al Barbre (born October 13, 1942) is an American former basketball coach. He has coached men's and women's basketball at the high school and college level. He served as an assistant coach for the Stephen F. Austin and Lamar men's basketball teams. At Stephen F. Austin, the Lumberjacks won 29 straight games in the 1969–70 season. He took over as the Lamar Lady Cardinals basketball head coach prior to the 1987–88 season. As head coach for the Lady Cardinals, his team's results improved each year. His 1990–91 team qualified for the 1991 NCAA Division I women's basketball tournament and defeated Texas, LSU, and Arkansas before losing to the eventual tournament champion finalist, Virginia Cavaliers, in the Elite Eight round. In addition to his coaching skills, he was a good recruiter.

At 29–4, his 1990–91 team holds the Lamar Lady Cardinals record for most wins in a season. The 1991 NCAA regional tournament game held on the Lady Cardinals' home court, the Montagne Center, against the LSU Lady Tigers set a Montagne Center attendance record for a women's basketball game with 9,143 fans in attendance.

Honors and probation
As head coach for the Lady Cardinals, Al Barbe was named American South Conference Co-coach of the Year in 1988 and 1989. In 1991, he was named American South Conference Coach of the Year and Converse District VI Coach of the Year.

Following an NCAA investigation, all wins for the 1990–91 season were vacated due to violations by the program. In addition, the program was placed on two years' probation and the number of allowed scholarships was reduced during the probation period. Al Barbre resigned as head coach. Barbre did not coach at the collegiate level again following his resignation in 1992.

Head coaching record

* 1990–91 wins vacated by the NCAA

References 

1942 births
Living people
High school basketball coaches in Texas
Lamar Cardinals basketball coaches
Lamar Lady Cardinals basketball coaches
Lon Morris College alumni
Stephen F. Austin Lumberjacks basketball coaches
Stephen F. Austin State University alumni
American women's basketball coaches